Stanisław Jaskułka (born 25 August 1958) is a retired Polish long jumper.

He was born in Puck, and represented the sports club AZS Warszawa. He won the gold medal at the 1977 European Junior Championships. He finished fourth at the 1977 European Indoor Championships, and fifth at the 1980 Olympic Games.

He won the bronze medal at the 1980 European Indoor Championships, promoted from fourth place after winner Ronald Desruelles was disqualified for doping. Another bronze medal followed at the 1985 Summer Universiade. He finished fifth at the 1986 European Championships. Participating at the 1987 World Championships, he recorded no valid mark.

He became Polish champion in 1980, 1981 1982, 1984 and 1986, and Polish indoor champion in 1977, 1979, 1981, 1985 and 1989.

His personal best jump was 8.13 metres, achieved at the 1980 Olympic Games.

References

1958 births
Living people
Polish male long jumpers
Athletes (track and field) at the 1980 Summer Olympics
Olympic athletes of Poland
People from Puck, Poland
Sportspeople from Pomeranian Voivodeship
Universiade medalists in athletics (track and field)
Universiade bronze medalists for Poland